Archie Dovell Sanders (June 17, 1857 – July 15, 1941) was a Republican member of the United States House of Representatives from New York.

Life
Sanders was born in Stafford, New York in 1857. He was a member of the New York State Assembly (Genesee Co.) in 1896 and 1897. He was a delegate to the 1896 and 1924 Republican National Conventions. He was a member of the New York State Senate (44th D.) in 1915 and 1916. He was elected to Congress in 1916 and served from March 4, 1917, until March 3, 1933. He was serving as the chairman of the Genesee County Republican Committee when he died in Rochester, New York in 1941.

Sources

1857 births
1941 deaths
Republican Party members of the New York State Assembly
People from Stafford, New York
Republican Party New York (state) state senators
Republican Party members of the United States House of Representatives from New York (state)